Saint-Privat is a commune in the Hérault department in the Occitanie region in southern France.

The Saint-Michel at Grandmont Priory is located in the commune.

Population

See also
Communes of the Hérault department

References

Communes of Hérault